Sāfī ( Sāpai; plur. ساپي Sāpī) is a major branch of the greater Ghurghakhti Pashtun tribe. The Safi tribe comprises a majority in the Pech Valley of Kunar and are present in significant numbers in Parwan Province (Kohi Safi), Kapisa Province, Kabul Province, Laghman Province, Nuristan Province, and Safi-yan in Balochistan  Close to Durand line, Lead by Haji Sardar Khan Safi, Saleem Khan Safi,Haji Abdullah Safi and Habibullah Safi. A reasonable majority also resides in different urban and rural areas of Khyber Pakhtunkhwa, particularly Peshawar, Charsadda, Mardan, Nowshehra, Swabi. A large number also settled in Rawalpindi, Tarnol, Karachi, Lahore, Multan. They are also present in large number in Mohmand, Bajaur Agency, Federally Administered Tribal Areas and in Zhob District, Balochistan, Pakistan. 
district {quetta} district {loralai} district {sibi}

Safi divisions
Currently, Safi tribesmen are found everywhere in Afghanistan and northwest Pakistan. The Safi are divided into three main clans: the 1-Gurbuz; the 2-Mehsud or Masawad; and the 3-Wazir or Wadair, also known as  Qandahari. The exact population number of this clan is not known; however, it is estimated to be around 2.5 million, both in Afghanistan and in the Federally Administered Tribal Areas of Pakistan. Safis have played an important role in Afghan society, especially in the Afghan Government; they were known to be opposed to the Afghan monarchy. The Safis have also had an important role in Pakistan. Currently, Safis serve in key posts in different public sector institutions. On 10 September 2007, Safi elders in the Mohmand Agency played a key part in reaching an agreement with TTP fighters to stop attacks on the Pakistani military and security forces, and on institutions such as schools and hospitals in the Mohmand Agency. The Safis, because of their association with the Mohmand, are also called Safi Mohmands but in fact are not Mohmand in origin.

Origins
Safi refers to one of the major Pashtun sub-tribes that are descended from Ghurghakht.

Safi is a major branch of the greater Ghurghakht Pashtun tribe. The Safi are divided into three main clans: the 1-Gurbuz; the 2-Mehsud or Masawad; and the 3-Wazir or Wadair, also known as  Qandahari. The exact population of this clan is not known; however, it is estimated to be around 3 million, both in Afghanistan and Pakistan (Khyber Pakhtoonkhwa, Balochistan and in different cities of Punjab).

History
The ancestry of the Safis reaches back to the inhabitants of the ancient kingdom of Gandhara, and they are related to the neighboring Nuristanis. Safis spoke a Kohistani Pashayi dialect. Throughout Pashtun history, the Safi have been mentioned, most famously during resistance against Aurangzeb, when a major war broke out in 1668. A rebellion was sparked by a general in the ranks of the Mughal Empire who had insulted a woman of this clan; in revenge Safi tribesmen killed the sepoy who had raped the safi woman. When news reached Aurangzeb that his sepoy was killed, he appealed to the tribe to hand over the killers, but the elders refused and challenged the Emperor. Soon Aurangzeb set out with a large force against the Safi and their allies from among other Khattak, Afridis, Shinwari, Mohmands in the command of Khushal Khan Khattak, who was at that time the tribal chief of Khattak tribe. Sources claim that Aurangzeb suffered a humiliating defeat, with a reported loss of 40,000 Mughal soldiers and only four left alive. Akhund Burkhurdar Khan, a famous freedom fighter, migrated towards Multan during his fights. His clan kept on fighting for years; today, this clan is headed by Khalid Khan Safi.

Currently, the Safi tribe is well known for its resistance to the Taliban regime, and many fierce clashes have broken out between the two. Some Safi tribesmen also live in Zabul Province close to the Durand line led byled by Haji Khudai-Dad Khan Safi, Haji Qalam Khan Safi, Haji Esmatullah Khan Safi, Haji Mohammad Juma Khan Safi, Dr Abdul Wali Safi, Mohammad Wali Safi and Abdullah Safi in Sibi District, with two sub clans: the Meerzai; and the Kamalzai. Safi also live in Zobh District In Baluchistan; they are together under Safi Ithad and their office is located at Mizan Chock in Mizan Plaza quetta. In Sibi, Safi have the lion's share of water, 8 Pao of water in Nari River.

References

Gharghashti Pashtun tribes
Pashto-language surnames
Pakistani names